Kilippattu is a 1987 Indian Malayalam film, directed by Raghavan. The film stars Adoor Bhasi, Nedumudi Venu, Menaka and Sukumaran in the lead roles. The film has musical score by M. B. Sreenivasan. Actor Jishnu Raghavan first appeared in this movie as a child artist. 

Notably, this film also marked the milestone of Menaka's 100th Malayalam film as a heroine who later quit acting immediately after marriage (of that same year).

Cast
Adoor Bhasi
Nedumudi Venu
Menaka
Sukumaran
Balan K. Nair
K. P. Ummer
Sabitha Anand
Jishnu Raghavan

Soundtrack
The music was composed by M. B. Sreenivasan and the lyrics were written by K. M. Raghavan Nambiar.

References

External links
 

1987 films
1980s Malayalam-language films